Karen Tite is an English actress based in Newcastle upon Tyne

She was formerly a member of the now-disbanded Purple Monkey Theatre Company, and was involved with the Valley Theatre Company also based in Scarborough.

Awards
In March 2007 Karen won the top prize at BBC Radio York's "More Front Than Scarborough" event for Comic Relief 2007, with a performance as Blodwyn Pigg.

In 2006 she won the Saltburn Drama Festival's adjudicator's award for her role in A Ticket For Graceland.
More recently she has worked in conjunction with the RSC and it's "Romeo and Juliet remix" at the Sage Gateshead. 
Entertained a crowd of would be standups at the Dog and Parrot pub Newcastle.
Was a lead actress in degree work at Newcastle college.
she is now a member of The Peoples Theatre Newcastle and appeared in " They Shoot Horses Don't They"

References
 Scarborough Evening News

External links
Valley Theatre Website
Karen Tite on BBC North Yorkshire

Year of birth missing (living people)
Living people
English stage actresses
Actors from Scarborough, North Yorkshire